Artyom Sergeyevich Gurenko (born 18 June 1994) is a Belarusian footballer who plays for Belshina Bobruisk.

Career
Before 2017 season, Gurenko moved from Lithuanian vice-champions Trakai to other A Lyga side Sūduva, but he left the club on 26 May 2017 by mutual agreement.

In March 2019 he returned to Lithuania and became a member of Riteriai (former FK Trakai). In August left FK Riteriai.

Honours
Sūduva Marijampolė
A Lyga champion: 2017

Family
He is a son of Belarusian coach and former footballer Sergei Gurenko.

References

External links

Profile at pressball.by

1994 births
Living people
Belarusian footballers
Association football midfielders
Belarusian expatriate footballers
Expatriate footballers in Lithuania
Expatriate footballers in Kazakhstan
Belarusian expatriate sportspeople in Lithuania
A Lyga players
FC Minsk players
FK Riteriai players
FK Sūduva Marijampolė players
FC Slutsk players
FC Dinamo Minsk players
FC Vitebsk players
FC Isloch Minsk Raion players
FC Belshina Bobruisk players
FC Turan players
Belarus under-21 international footballers